Dalaw  is a 2010 Filipino suspense-horror film starring Kris Aquino and Diether Ocampo. The film was released by Star Cinema. It was an official entry at the 2010 Metro Manila Film Festival.

Plot
Stella decides to marry Anton 3 years after her husband died. Anton was her great love before she was forced by her parents to marry Danilo. However, at the wedding, Anton's mother Milagros is left paralyzed and unable to speak after being attacked by an unknown entity who later kills her shortly afterwards. After moving to Anton's place, Stella experiences major hauntings that endanger her and her son. Stella assumes that his late husband is the one responsible for the hauntings and tries to placate him, only for the hauntings to escalate. Eventually, Stella and Anton's clairvoyant housekeeper Olga realize that the entity responsible is the ghost of Lorna, Anton's ex-girlfriend who was accidentally killed by Anton and buried in a forest. Lorna then attacks Stella's household, killing Olga. Feeling guilt over their predicament, Anton leaves to confront Lorna at her grave but is followed by Stella. In a final confrontation Lorna kills Anton but is killed in turn by Stella, who arranges for her grave to be hastily blessed as she is comforted by Anton's ghost. Afterwards, Stella and her son move out of Anton's house, unaware of a black liquid oozing out the back of their taxi.

Cast

Reception
The film marks the return of Kris Aquino to the horror genre, in which she was tagged as 'Philippine's Box-office Horror Queen' due to the success of her two previous films, Feng Shui and Sukob.
The film was a box-office success, placing in third place at the list of the highest-grossing entries for the 2010 Metro Manila Film Festival.

See also
List of ghost films

References

External links

2010 films
2010 horror films
2010s English-language films
Philippine horror films
Star Cinema films
2010s Tagalog-language films
2010 multilingual films
Philippine multilingual films
Films directed by Dondon Santos